The MIT Crime Club was a Massachusetts Institute of Technology student group known for its attempts to develop technological methods of addressing crime problems and for its unauthorized investigation of a murder in a Harvard dorm. It was established in 2005 to undertake campus-safety projects and raise awareness of crimes in the MIT area. The group rebroadcast police radio transmissions online, assembled police-log compilations, and constructed crime maps.

In 2009 the club hired two private detectives to investigate the murder of a drug dealer in a Harvard residence hall. As the private detectives were unjustly arrested and prosecuted; the case was dismissed before trial. The club later contributed to a Snapped: Killer Couples television episode about the murder.

History 

The MIT Crime Club was established by two MIT students in 2005. Harvard students also joined the group.

On June 2, 2009, a Boston Globe correspondent wrote that MIT's news office said MIT did not know of any crime club at the school. In August, a staff writer at Boston magazine reported that the club was an MIT-authorized group with a membership of five MIT students and one or more graduates.

Activities 

The group compiled incident data from police logs and constructed crime maps and was rebroadcasting MIT, Harvard, and Cambridge police radio transmissions online. Members wrote weekly police-log compilations for MIT's newspaper, The Tech.

In 2009 the group awarded an MIT dormitory a "Sparky the Fire Dog Award for Not Setting Off as Many Fire Alarms as Last Year". In 2010 the group sponsored and hosted an MIT event, the MIT Security Workers Solidarity Gathering, where the patrol officers' union discussed upcoming negotiations.

In September 2011 the Cambridge City Council adopted a resolution thanking the members for sponsoring bicycle theft-prevention workshops and so forth. "Club members have for six years furnished MIT students with technology and data of value in safeguarding their persons and property ..."

Influence 

In 2006 a club member who had written police log compilations at the Tech was hired by the Cambridge Chronicle as its first "Police Log Compiler for MIT and Harvard".

On May 30, 2009, the group hired a private-detective team to investigate security at Harvard University after a marijuana dealer was shot to death in a dormitory basement. The detective and his assistant were arrested by university police and prosecuted on charges of breaking and entering and trespass. A Massachusetts District Court judge dismissed the case before trial, finding that the evidence offered by the prosecutors was legally insufficient to convict the defendants.

PI Magazine, a trade journal, said of the ruling:

One apparent implication is that investigators may take photographs in residential common areas at universities without being subject to immediate arrest. Permission can be granted by an occupant of the residence hall floor. Investigators need not obtain permission of the owner.

The club later contributed to a Killer Couples television episode about the shooting.

Finances 

The group was funded in part by alumni contributions. MIT's alumni association established an MIT Crime Club Fund to support its initiatives.

References 

Massachusetts Institute of Technology student life
Student organizations by university or college in the United States
Civil crime prevention
2005 establishments in Massachusetts
Organizations established in 2005